Florence Beatrice Price (née Smith; April 9, 1887 – June 3, 1953) was an American classical composer, pianist, organist and music teacher. Born in Little Rock, Arkansas, Price was educated at the New England Conservatory of Music, and was active in Chicago from 1927 until her death in 1953. Price is noted as the first African-American woman to be recognized as a symphonic composer, and the first to have a composition played by a major orchestra. Price composed over 300 works: four symphonies, four concertos, as well as choral works, art songs, chamber music and music for solo instruments. In 2009, a substantial collection of her works and papers was found in her abandoned summer home.

Biography

Early life and education
Florence Beatrice Smith was born to Florence (Gulliver) and James H. Smith on April 9, 1887, in Little Rock, Arkansas, one of three children in a mixed-race family. Her father was the only African-American dentist in the city, and her mother was a music teacher who guided Florence's early musical training. Despite racial issues of the era, her family was well respected and did well within their community. She gave her first piano performance at the age of four and had her first composition published at the age of 11.

She attended school at a Catholic convent, and in 1901 by the time she was 14, she graduated as valedictorian (scholar) of her class. In 1902, after high school, she enrolled in the New England Conservatory of Music in Boston, Massachusetts with a double major in organ and piano teaching. Initially, she passed as Mexican to avoid racial discrimination against African Americans, listing her hometown as "Pueblo, Mexico". At the Conservatory, she studied composition and counterpoint with composers George Chadwick and Frederick Converse. Also while there, Smith wrote her first string trio and symphony. She graduated in 1906 with honors, and with both an artist diploma in organ and a teaching certificate.

Career
In 1910, Smith returned to Arkansas, where she taught briefly and moved to Atlanta, Georgia. There she became the head of the music department of what is now Clark Atlanta University, a historically Black college. In 1912, she married Thomas J. Price, a lawyer. She gave up her teaching position and moved back to Little Rock, Arkansas, where he had his practice and had two daughters. She could not find work in the by now racially segregated town.

After a series of racial incidents in Little Rock, particularly a lynching of a Black man in 1927, the Price family decided to leave. Like many Black families living in the Deep South, they moved north in the Great Migration to escape Jim Crow conditions, and settled in Chicago, a major industrial city.

There Florence Price began a new and fulfilling period in her composition career; she was part of the Chicago Black Renaissance. She studied composition, orchestration, and organ with the leading teachers in the city, including Arthur Olaf Andersen, Carl Busch, Wesley La Violette, and Leo Sowerby. She published four pieces for piano in 1928. While in Chicago, Price was at various times enrolled at the Chicago Musical College, Chicago Teacher's College, University of Chicago, and American Conservatory of Music, studying languages and liberal arts subjects as well as music.

In 1930, an important early success occurred at the twelfth annual convention of the National Association of Negro Musicians (NANM), when pianist-composer Margaret Bonds premiered Price's Fantasie nègre [No. 1] (1929) in its original version titled "Negro Fantasy". Of this performance, Carl Ditton wrote for the Associated Negro Press:
The surprise of the evening was a most effective composition by Mrs. F. B. Price, entitled 'A Negro Phantasy', played by the talented Chicago pianiste, Margaret Bonds. The entire association [i.e., NANM] could well afford to recommend this number to all advanced pianists.

In 1931, financial struggles and abuse by her husband resulted in Price getting a divorce at age 44. She became a single mother to her two daughters. To make ends meet, she worked as an organist for silent film screenings and composed songs for radio ads under a pen name. During this time, Price lived with friends. She eventually moved in with her student and friend, Margaret Bonds, also a Black pianist and composer. This friendship connected Price with writer Langston Hughes and contralto Marian Anderson, both prominent figures in the art world who aided in Price's future success as a composer. Together, Price and Bonds began to achieve national recognition for their compositions and performances.

In 1932, both Price and Bonds submitted compositions for the Wanamaker Foundation Awards. Price won first prize with her Symphony in E minor, and third for her Piano Sonata, earning her a $500 prize. (Bonds came in first place in the song category, with a song entitled "Sea Ghost".)

Early in 1933 leading Arts advocate Maude Roberts George, president of the Chicago Music Association, music critic of the Chicago Defender and eventual national president of the National Association of Negro Musicians, paid $250 (about $5,093 in 2021 dollars) for Price's First Symphony to be included in a program devoted to "The Negro in Music", with the Chicago Symphony Orchestra, conducted by Frederick Stock, as part of the Century of Progress World's Fair. Although this concert, like the Fair in general, was unmistakably tainted by the racism that characterized Chicago and the U.S. in general in the 1930s, George's underwriting made Price the first African-American woman to have her music played by a major U.S. orchestra. Later in that same season the Illinois Host House of the World's Fair devoted an entire program to Price and her music, a striking invitation given that Price had adopted Illinois as her home state only five years earlier.

A number of Price's other orchestral works were played by the Works Progress Administration Symphony Orchestra of Detroit, the Chicago Women's Symphony, and the Women's Symphony Orchestra of Chicago.

In 1940, Price was inducted into the American Society of Composers, Authors, and Publishers for her work as a composer. 
In 1949, Price published two of her spiritual arrangements, "I Am Bound for the Kingdom", and "I'm Workin' on My Buildin'", and dedicated them to Marian Anderson, who performed them on a regular basis.

Personal life 
In 1912, Price married prominent Arkansas attorney, Thomas J. Price (also known as John Gray Lucas), upon returning to Arkansas from Atlanta. Together, they had two daughters and a son; Florence (d. 1975), Edith and Thomas Jr. The Price children were raised in Chicago.

Florence Price divorced Thomas Price in January 1931, and on February 14, 1931, she married the widower Pusey Dell Arnett (1875–1957), an insurance agent and former baseball player for the Chicago Unions some thirteen years her senior. She and Arnett were separated by April 1934; they apparently never divorced.
 
On June 3, 1953, Price died from a stroke in Chicago, Illinois, at the age of 66.

Legacy and honors

In 1964, the Chicago Public Schools opened Florence B. Price Elementary School (also known as Price Lit & Writing Elementary School) at 4351 South Drexel Boulevard in the North Kenwood neighborhood of Chicago, Illinois in her honor. Price's student body was predominately African-American. The school operated from 1964 until the school district decided to phase it out in 2011 due to poor academic performance which ultimately led to its closing in 2013. The school housed a piano owned by Price. The school building currently houses a local church as of 2019. 
In February 2019, The University of Arkansas Honors College held a concert honoring Price. In October 2019, the International Florence Price Festival announced that its inaugural gathering celebrating Price's music and legacy would take place at the University of Maryland School of Music in August 2020. From 4 to 8 January 2021 Price was the BBC Radio 3 Composer of the Week.

Following her death, much of her work was overshadowed as new musical styles emerged that fit the changing tastes of modern society. Some of her work was lost, but as more African-American and female composers gained attention for their works, so has Price. In 2001, the Women's Philharmonic created an album of some of her work. 
In 2011, pianist Karen Walwyn and The New Black Repertory Ensemble performed Price's Concerto in One Movement and Symphony in E minor.

Discovery of manuscripts in 2009
In 2009, a substantial collection of her works and papers was found in an abandoned dilapidated house on the outskirts of St. Anne, Illinois, which Price had used as a summer home. These consisted of dozens of her scores, including her two violin concertos and her fourth symphony. As Alex Ross stated in The New Yorker in February 2018, "not only did Price fail to enter the canon; a large quantity of her music came perilously close to obliteration. That run-down house in St. Anne is a potent symbol of how a country can forget its cultural history." 
Three settings of her work Abraham Lincoln Walks at Midnight were rediscovered in 2009; a setting for orchestra, organ, chorus, and soloists was premiered on April 12, 2019 by the Du Bois Orchestra and Lyricora Chamber Choir in Cambridge, Massachusetts.

In November 2018, the music publisher G. Schirmer announced that it had acquired the exclusive worldwide rights to Florence Price's complete catalog.
In 2021, classical pianist Lara Downes initiated a project, Rising Sun Music, to draw attention to the influence of composers from a diversity of backgrounds upon American Classical music, assisted by producers such as Adam Abeshouse, to release newly recorded works of composers such as Price and Harry Burleigh, whose importance often has been lost in historical accounts of the development in the field.

With the 2022 installment in the Catalyst Quartet’s ongoing Uncovered series focusing on the music of Black composers comes nearly two hours' worth of Price’s chamber music. "The most substantial piece, Price’s A-minor Quintet for Piano and Strings got its first recording just last year, courtesy of the Kaleidoscope Chamber Collective. Like that one, this performance impresses for its technical and expressive excellence: everything’s beautifully balanced and comes to life just as it should." Also from artsfuse.org's Jonathan Blumhofer: "Taken together, this is an album that’s at once musically significant but, more than that, thoroughly enjoyable. How tragic that, largely on account of her race and gender, Price’s music was almost erased. Yet how happy it is that revivals do happen – and how exciting that, thanks to the advocacy of groups like the Catalysts and musicians like [Michelle] Cann, we’re seeing a deserving composer finally taking her place in the American canon."

Works

Composition style
Even though her training was steeped in European tradition, Price's music is in an American idiom and reveals her Southern roots. The strong influence of the composition style of Dvorak is often noticeable, e.g., in her first violin concerto. She wrote with a vernacular style, using sounds and ideas that fit the reality of urban society. Being a committed Christian, she frequently used the music of the African-American church as material for her arrangements. At the urging of her mentor George Whitefield Chadwick, Price began to incorporate elements of African-American spirituals, emphasizing the rhythm and syncopation of the spirituals rather than just using the text. In her first symphony, a melody is inspired by the spiritual but solidly rooted in instrumental writing. Compared with Dvorak's 9th symphony, the third movement is titled Juba Dance. This antebellum folk dance would further inspire European art music composers like Debussy in its later manifestation the cakewalk. The weaving of tradition and modernism reflected the way life was for African Americans in large cities at the time.

Florence Price composed numerous works: four symphonies, four concertos, as well as choral works, plus art songs, and music for chamber and solo instruments, works for violin, organ anthems, piano pieces, spiritual arrangements, three piano concertos, and two violin concertos. Some of her more popular works are: "Three Little Negro Dances", "Songs to the Dark Virgin", "My Soul's Been Anchored in the Lord" for piano or orchestra and voice, and "Moon Bridge". Price made considerable use of characteristic African-American melodies and rhythms in many of her works. In the program notes for her piano piece Three Little Negro Dances, Price wrote: "In all types of Negro music, rhythm is of preeminent importance. In the dance, it is a compelling, onward-sweeping force that tolerates no interruption... All phases of truly Negro activity—whether work or play, singing or praying—are more than apt to take on a rhythmic quality."

Symphonies
 Symphony No. 1 in E minor (1931–32); First Prize in the Rodman Wanamaker Competition, 1932
 Symphony No. 2 in G minor (c. 1935, presumed lost)
 Symphony No. 3 in C minor (1938–40)
 Symphony No. 4 in D minor (1945)

Concertos
 Piano Concerto in D minor (1932–34); often referred to as Piano Concerto in One Movement although the work is in three separate movements
 Violin Concerto No. 1 in D major (1939)
 Violin Concerto No. 2 in D minor (1952)
 Rhapsody/Fantasie for piano and orchestra (date unknown, possibly incomplete)

Other orchestral works
 Ethiopia's Shadow in America (1929–32)
 Mississippi River Suite (1934); although labelled as a "suite", the work is cast in one continuous large-scale movement, in which several famous Mississippi river songs are quoted, such as “Go Down, Moses”, “Nobody Knows the Trouble I've Seen” and "Deep River".
 Chicago Suite (date unknown)
 Colonial Dance Symphony (date unknown)
 Concert Overture No. 1 (date unknown); based on the spiritual "Sinner, Please Don’t Let This Harvest Pass"
 Concert Overture No. 2 (1943); based on three spirituals ("Go Down, Moses", "Ev'ry Time I Feel the Spirit", "Nobody Knows the Trouble I've Seen")
 The Oak, tone poem (1943); sometimes referred to as Songs of the Oak
 Suite of Negro Dances (performed in 1951; orchestral version of the Three Little Negro Dances for piano, 1933;); also referred to as Suite of Dances
 Dances in the Canebrakes (orchestral version of the piano work, 1953)

Choral

 "The Moon Bridge" (M. R. Gamble), SSA, 1930;
 "The New Moon", SSAA, 2 pf, 1930;
 "The Wind and the Sea" (P. L. Dunbar), SSAATTBB, pf, str qt, 1934;
 "Night" (Bessie Mayle), SSA, pf (1945)
 "Witch of the Meadow" (Gamble), SSA (1947);
 "Sea Gulls", female chorus, fl, cl, vn, va, vc, pf, by 1951;
 "Nature's Magic" (Gamble), SSA (1953);
 "Song for Snow" (E. Coatsworth), SATB (1957);
 "Abraham Lincoln walks at midnight" (V. Lindsay), mixed vv, orch, org;
 "After the 1st and 6th Commandments", SATB;
 "Communion Service", F, SATB, org;
 "Nod" (W. de la Mare), TTBB; 
  Resignation (Price), SATB;
 "Song of Hope" (Price);
 "Spring Journey", SSA, str qt

Solo vocal (all with piano)

 "Don't You Tell Me No" (Price) (between 1931 and 1934)
 "Dreamin' Town" (Dunbar), 1934;
 4 Songs, B-Bar, 1935;
 "My Dream" (Hughes), 1935;
 "Dawn's Awakening" (J. J. Burke), 1936;
 Four Songs from The Weary Blues (Hughes) (April 26, 1935): "My Dream", "Songs to the Dark Virgin", "Ardella", "Dream Ships"." [Note: The Weary Blues here refers to the anthology volume, not the title poem itself]
 Monologue for the Working Class (Langston Hughes) (October 1941)
 "Hold Fast to Dreams" (Hughes), 1945;
 "Night" (L. C. Wallace), (1946);
 "Out of the South Blew a Wind" (F.C. Woods), (1946);
 "An April Day" (J. F. Cotter), (1949);
 "The Envious Wren" (A. and P. Carey);
 "Fantasy in Purple" (Hughes);
 "Feet o' Jesus" (Hughes);
 "Forever" (Dunbar);
 "The Glory of the Day was in her Face" (J. W. Johnson);
 "The Heart of a Woman" (G. D. Johnson); 
 "Love-in-a-Mist" (Gamble);
 "Nightfall" (Dunbar); "Resignation" (Price), also arr. chorus;
 "Song of the Open Road; Sympathy" (Dunbar);
 "To my Little Son" (J. J. Davis);
 "Travel's End" (M. F. Hoisington); 
 "Judgement Day" (Hughes)
 "Some o' These Days"
 about 90 other works

Instrumental chamber music
 Andante con espressione (1929)
 String Quartet (No. 1) in G major (1929)
 Fantasie [No. 1] in G Minor for Violin and Piano (1933)
 String Quartet (No. 2) in A minor (published in 1935)
 Piano Quintet in E minor (1936)
 Piano Quintet in A minor (1936?) 
 Five Folksongs in Counterpoint for String Quartet
 Suite (Octet) for Brasses and Piano (1948–49)
 Fantasy [No. 2] in F-sharp Minor for Violin and Piano (1940)
 Moods, for Flute, Clarinet and Piano (1953)
 Spring Journey, for 2 violins, viola, cello, double bass and piano

Works for piano

 Tarantella (1926)
 Impromptu No. 1 (1926)
 Valsette Mignon (1926) 
 Preludes (1926–32): No. 1 Allegro moderato; No. 2 Andantino cantabile; No. 3 Allegro molto; No. 4 [“Wistful”] Allegretto con tenerezza; No. 5 Allegro
 At the Cotton Gin (1927); published by G. Schirmer (New York), 1928
 [Six Descriptive Pieces]: [No. 1] Little Truants (October 7, 1927); No. 2. Two Busy Little Hands; No. 3. Hard Problems (October 9, 1927); [No. 4.] Tittle Tattle; [No. 5] In Romance Land (October 24–25, 1927); [No. 6.] Hilda's Waltz (Oct. 26, 1927).
 Pensive Mood (March 3, 1928)
 Scherzo in G (May 24, 1929 [?])
 Song without Words in G Major (1928 or early 1930s)
 Meditation ([ca. 1929])
 Fantasie nègre [No. 1] (E minor) (1929, as "Negro Fantasy"; rev. 1931); based on the spiritual "Sinner, please don't let this harvest pass" (original version premiered September 3, 1930, by Margaret Bonds at twelfth annual convention of National Association of Negro Musicians, Chicago).
 On a Quiet Lake (June 23, 1929)
 Waltz of the Spring Maid (ca. early 1930s)
 Barcarolle (ca. 1929-32)
 His Dream (ca. 1930-31)
 Cotton Dance (Dance of the Cotton Blossoms) (1931)
 Fantasie nègre No. 2 in G minor (March, 1932)
 Fantasie nègre No. 3 in F minor (March 30, 1932)(inc.) 
 Fantasie nègre No. 4 in B minor (April 5, 1932 - [ca. 1937]) (4 versions)
 Song without Words in A Major (April 21, 1932)
 Piano Sonata in E minor (1932)
 Child Asleep (July 6, 1932)
 Etude [in C major] [ca. 1932]
 3 Little Negro Dances (1933); also arranged for concert band (1939); for two pianos (1949); and for orchestra (before 1951)
 Tecumseh (published by Carl Fischer, New York, 1935)
 Scenes in Tin Can Alley (ca. 1937): "The Huckster" (October 1, 1928), "Children at Play", "Night"
 3 Sketches for little pianists (1937)
 Arkansas Jitter (1938)
 Bayou Dance (1938)
 Dance of the Cotton Blossoms (1938)
 Summer Moon (for Memry Midgett) (April 6, 1938)
 Down a Southern Lane (April 29, 1939)
 Joy in June (June 27, 1938)
 On a Summer's Eve (June 15, 1939)
 Rocking chair (1939)
 Thumbnail Sketches of a Day in the Life of a Washerwoman (ca. 1938-40). Two versions. First version consists of "Morning", "Dreaming at the Washtub", "A Gay Moment", and "Evening Shadows"; second version omits "Dreaming at the Washtub". 
 Rowing: Little Concert Waltz [?1930s].
 [Ten Negro Spirituals for the Piano] [1937-42): Let Us Cheer the Weary Traveler; I’m Troubled in My Mind; I Know the Lord Has Laid His Hands on Me; Joshua Fit de Battle of Jericho; Gimme That Old Time Religion; Swing Low, Sweet Chariot; I Want Jesus to Walk with Me; Peter, Go Ring dem Bells; Were You There When They Crucified My Lord; Lord, I Want to Be a Christian
 An Old Love Letter [ca. 1941].
 Remembrance (1941 or earlier) (to Mr. Henry S. Sawyer) 
 Village Scenes (1942): "Church Spires in Moonlight", "A Shaded Lane", "The Park"
 Your Hands in Mine (1943) (originally titled Memory Lane)
 [Four Pieces for Piano Solo]: "Levee at Noontime -- Barcarolle" (17 November 1943); "Little Miss Perky" (17 November 1943); "Smile, Smile!" (17 November 1943); "Fairy Fun (or Fairies' Frolic)" [originally "Little Toe Dancer"] (19 October 1943).
 Clouds [ca. 1940s]
 Cotton Dance (Presto) ([ca. 1940s])
 2 Fantasies on Folk Tunes (date unknown)
 In Sentimental Mood (1947)
 Whim Wham (July 6, 1946)
 Placid Lake (July 17, 1947)
 Memories of Dixieland (1947); won Holstein Award, 1947
 Sketches in Sepia (September, 1947)
 Rock-a-bye (1947)
 [Six Piano Pieces] (11 and 12 November 1947) 
 [Three Roses]: To a Yellow Rose, To a White Rose, To a Red Rose (1949)
 To a Brown Leaf (1949)
 First Romance (ca. 1940s)
 Waltzing on a Sunbeam (ca. 1950
 The Goblin and the Mosquito (1951)
 Snapshots (1952): I. Lake Mirror (13 October 1952), II. Moon behind a Cloud (17 July 1949), III. Flame (14 January 1949)
 Until We Meet (1952)
 Dances in the Canebrakes (1953); also orchestrated
 about 70 teaching pieces

Undated: 
 I'm Troubled in My Mind
 Pieces to a Certain Pair of Newlyweds [only No. 1]
 Three Miniature Portraits of Uncle Ned (originally "Three Miniature Portraits of Uncle Joe"; later "Two Photographs" (second version performed 15 April 1948)

Arrangements of spirituals
 "My soul's been anchored in de Lord", 1v, pf (1937), arr. 1v, orch, arr. chorus, pf;
 "Nobody knows the trouble I've Seen (Philadelphia: Theodore Presser, 1938);
 "Some o' These Days", 1v, pf
Two Traditional Negro Spirituals, 1 v, pf (1940): "I Am Bound for the Kingdom" and "I'm Workin' on My Buildin'" Her Concert Overture on Negro Spirituals, Symphony in E minor, and Negro Folksongs in Counterpoint for string quartet, all serve as excellent examples of her idiomatic work.
 "Were you there when they crucified my Lord?", pf (1942);
 "I am bound for the kingdom", 1v, pf (1948);
 "I'm workin' on my building", 1v, pf job at Florida
 "Heav'n bound soldier", male chorus, 1949 [2 arrs.];

Undated:
 "Joshua Fit de Battle of Jericho" (ca. 1950)
 "Peter, Go Ring dem Bells" (undated) 
 Variations on a Folksong (Peter, go ring dem bells)", org (1996);
 "I couldn't hear nobody pray", SSAATTBB;
 "Save me, Lord, save me", 1v, pf;
 "Trouble done come my way", 1v, pf;
 ?12 other works, 1v, pf
MSS of 40 songs in US-PHu; other MSS in private collections; papers and duplicate MSS in U. of Arkansas, Florida

Works for organ
(supplied by Calvert Johnson)
 Adoration in The Organ Portfolio vol. 15/86 (December 1951), Dayton OH: Lorenz Publishing Co., 34–35.
 Andante, July 24, 1952
 Andantino
 Allegretto
 Cantilena March 10, 1951
 Caprice
 Dainty Lass, by November 19, 1936
 Echoes of a Prayer (by July 14, 1950)
 Festal March
 First Sonata for Organ, 1927
 The Hour Glass [formerly Sandman]. paired with Retrospection as No. 1
 Hour of Peace or Hour of Contentment or Gentle Heart, November 16, 1951
 In Quiet Mood [formerly Evening and then Impromptu], New York: Galaxy Music Corp, 1951 (dated Aug. 7, 1941)
 Little Melody
 Little Pastorale
 Offertory in The Organ Portfolio vol. 17/130 (1953). Dayton OH: Lorenz Publishing Co., 1953
 O Solemn Thought, by July 14, 1950
 Passacaglia and Fugue, January, 1927
 A Pleasant Thought, December 10, 1951
 Prelude and Fantasie, by 1942
 Retrospection [formerly An Elf on a Moonbeam], paired with The Hour Glass as No. 2
 Steal Away to Jesus, by November 19, 1936
 Suite No. 1, by April 6, 1942
 Memory Mist (1949)
 Tempo moderato [no title], seriously damaged and possibly incomplete]
 Variations on a Folksong
Principal publishers: Fischer, Gamble-Hinged, Handy, McKinley, Presser

Works for violin (with piano accompaniment)
 Andante Con Espressione
 Deserted Garden
 Elfentanz
 Fantasie in G minor for Violin and Piano (1933)

Discography

See also
 William Grant Still

References

Additional sources
Ammer, Christine. Unsung: A History of Women in American Music. Portland Oregon, Amadeus Press, 2001
Brown, Rae Linda. . Accessed March 15, 2007.
Brown, Rae Linda. "William Grant Still, Florence Price, and William Dawson: Echoes of the Harlem Renaissance", in Samuel A. Floyd, Jr (ed.), Black Music in the Harlem Renaissance, Knoxville: University of Tennessee Press, 1990, pp. 71–86.
 Ege, Samantha. "Florence Price and the Politics of Her Existence", Kapralova Society Journal 16, no. 1 (Spring 2018): 1–10.
"Florence Beatrice Smith Price", Biography.com. Retrieved December 1, 2014. 
 Mashego, Shana Thomas. Music from the Soul of Woman: The Influence of the African American Presbyterian and Methodist Traditions on the Classical Compositions of Florence Price and Dorothy Rudd Moore. DMA, The University of Arizona, 2010.
 Perkins, Holly Ellistine. Biographies of Black Composers and Songwriters; A Supplementary Textbook. Iowa: Wm. C. Brown Publishers, 1990.
"Price, Florence Beatrice", Encyclopedia of World Biography. 2006. Encyclopedia.com. December 1, 2014.
Slonimsky, Nicolas (ed.) (1994), The Concise Edition of Baker's Biographical Dictionary of Musicians, 8th edn, New York: Schirmer, p. 791.

Further reading

Brown, Rae Linda (2020). The Heart of a Woman: The Life and Music of Florence B. Price. Chicago: University of Illinois Press. .

External links
 Florence Price − American Heritage
 Florence Price − Violin Concerto No. 2 (1952)
 Florence B. Price Music Manuscripts, Library of Congress
 Florence Beatrice Smith Price (1888–1953), Correspondence, musical scores, and other papers, 1906–1975, University of Arkansas, Special Collections, Manuscript Collection 988:
 

 Florence Price and the Politics of Her Existence in Kapralova Society Journal, 16, no. 1 (Spring 2018): 1–10.
 Symphony No. 1 in Em, From the Archives
 
 Downes' mini-album features music by Florence Price and Harry T. Burleigh. The interview discusses Florence Price.
Florence Price - Website Dedicated to Florence Price

1887 births
1953 deaths
20th-century American composers
20th-century American women musicians
20th-century classical composers
20th-century women composers
African-American classical composers
American classical composers
American women composers
African-American women classical composers
African-American women musicians
American Conservatory of Music alumni
American women classical composers
Chicago Musical College alumni
Classical musicians from Illinois
Composers for pipe organ
Musicians from Chicago
Musicians from Little Rock, Arkansas
New England Conservatory alumni
Pupils of George Whitefield Chadwick
University of Chicago alumni